No. 274 Squadron RAF existed briefly in 1918 and 1919 as a patrol and bomber squadron, and served in World War II as a fighter squadron.

History
The squadron began to form as a patrol squadron, intended to fly Vickers Vimys, at Seaton Carew in November 1918 a few days before the end of World War I. The squadron formation was then cancelled. 

No. 5 (Communication) Squadron formed at Bircham Newton, in 1919, but then became No. 274 Squadron on 15 June 1919. It was a bomber squadron, flying Handley Page V/1500s, but then disbanded after six months, on 30 January 1920.

It was back in action by 1940, equipped with Hawker Hurricanes. For Operation Overlord (the Allied invasion of Normandy) it was equipped with the Spitfire IX F operating from RAF Detling in Air Defence of Great Britain, though under the operational control of RAF Second Tactical Air Force.

See also
 List of Royal Air Force aircraft squadrons

References

Notes

Bibliography

 Ken Delve, D-Day: The Air Battle, London: Arms & Armour Press, 1994, .
 Halley, James J. The Squadrons of the Royal Air Force & Commonwealth 1918-1988. Tonbridge, Kent, UK: Air Britain (Historians) Ltd., 1988. .
 Jefford, C.G. RAF Squadrons, a Comprehensive Record of the Movement and Equipment of all RAF Squadrons and their Antecedents since 1912. Shrewsbury, Shropshire, UK: Airlife Publishing, 2001. .
 Rawlings, John D.R. Fighter Squadrons of the RAF and their Aircraft. London: Macdonald and Jane's Publishers Ltd., 1969 (second edition 1976). .

External links

 274 Squadron Official history
 History of No.'s 271–275 Squadrons Air of Authority
 

Military units and formations established in 1918
274 Squadron
1918 establishments in the United Kingdom